Unity was 311's third independent release (following their 1989 EP Downstairs and 1990 album Dammit!) and first CD release on their own record company, What Have You Records. It was released in 1991 on both CD and Cassette. It is considered by some to be the band's second album if Dammit! is counted as their debut album. This album is no longer in print and is very rare, and there were only 1,000 original copies on CD and 500 on cassette that were pressed and released for this album.

Track listing
 "Slinky" (N. Hexum) - 5:17
 "Feels So Good" (N. Hexum, C. Sexton, D. Martinez) - 3:08
 "Do You Right" (C. Sexton, N. Hexum) - 4:27
 "!@#$ the &*?=!" (N. Hexum, C. Sexton, T. Mahoney, A. Wills, D. Martinez) - 2:54 *Listed as "F the B" in the liner notes
 "Summer of Love" (N. Hexum) - 5:09
 "Unity" (C. Sexton, N. Hexum) - 3:18
 "Damn" (N. Hexum) - 3:31
 "Down South" (N. Hexum, C. Sexton, M. Watkins, T. Mahoney) - 3:32
 "Rollin'" (N. Hexum, C. Sexton, A. Wills, T. Mahoney) - 3:12
 "Right Now" (N. Hexum, C. Sexton, C. Grubb) - 4:13
 "C.U.T.M." (N. Hexum, A. Wills) - 3:37 *Abbreviation for "Cosmic Utopian Thriving Mission" as listed in the liner notes

Personnel
Tim Mahoney – guitar
Chad Sexton – drums
P-Nut – bass, vocals, percussion
Nick Hexum – vocals, percussion
Doug Martinez – guest vocals
Produced and mixed by 311 and J.E. Van Horne
Recorded and mixed at Rainbow Studios Omaha, Nebraska

References

External links
MusicMoz website for Unity.

311 (band) albums
1990 albums